In the city of Brighton and Hove, on the English Channel coast of Southeast England, more than 50  former places of worship—many with considerable architectural or townscape merit—have been demolished, for reasons ranging from declining congregations to the use of unsafe building materials.  Brighton and Hove was granted city status in 2000 after being designated a unitary authority three years earlier through the merger of the fashionable, long-established seaside resort of Brighton and the mostly Victorian residential town of Hove. In both towns, and in surrounding villages and suburbs, a wide range of Christian churches were established—mostly in the 19th and early 20th centuries.  More than 150 of these survive (although not all are still in religious use), but demolition and the redevelopment of sites for residential and commercial use has been happening since the 1920s.  Postwar trends of declining church attendance and increasing demands for land accelerated the closure and destruction of church buildings: many demolitions were carried out in the 1950s and 1960s, and five churches were lost in 1965 alone.  Although most of these buildings dated from the urban area's strongest period of growth in the 19th century, some newer churches have also been lost: one survived just 20 years.

Brighton and Hove's religious history

The former fishing village of Brighthelmston, with its hilltop parish church dedicated to St Nicholas, experienced steady growth from the mid-18th century as its reputation as a fashionable resort grew.  More chapels and churches were founded as the seasonal and permanent population grew; one of the first was linked to the Countess of Huntingdon's Connexion, a Methodist-based sect whose stronghold was the county of Sussex (which Brighton was part of).  The first chapel on the site, founded in 1761, was the Connexion's first church in England. A Baptist chapel of 1788 in Bond Street, the predecessor of Salem Strict Baptist Chapel (demolished 1974), was the first of many places of worship for that denomination in the Brighton area. Neighbouring Hove, which also had an ancient parish church (dedicated to St Andrew), in turn began to thrive, and churches of many denominations were built as its population rose.

Reverend Henry Michell Wagner was the Anglican vicar of Brighton for much of the 19th century.  His son Reverend Arthur Wagner was also an important part of religious life in the town throughout his adult life. Both men were rich, charitably minded and proactive, and they established a series of churches in poor parts of Brighton to make Anglican worship more widely accessible in a town where pew rental (a requirement to pay to worship) was still an established practice.  In 1824, when Henry Michell Wagner's tenure began, there were about 3,000 free places in the town's churches, but about 20,000 people were considered poor enough to need them. Between them, the Wagners funded 11 new churches in densely populated lower-class areas of Brighton, which contributed to the near-doubling of Anglican church provision in Brighton in a 25-year period of the mid-19th century. By the postwar period, as people moved to new suburbs and rising land values in central Brighton encouraged the replacement of houses with commercial and entertainment buildings, many of these churches were no longer needed.  Six of the eleven Wagner churches were demolished: only two of Arthur Wagner's six survive, along with three of his son's five.

The Roman Catholic community lost two churches without replacement within less than 10 years in outlying parts of the urban area.  The large council estate of Whitehawk was developed from the 1930s to the 1960s and extensively rebuilt between 1975 and 1988. In response to this growth, St John the Baptist's Roman Catholic church established a small Mass centre, dedicated to St Louis of France, on the estate in 1964.  It was in use for just 18 years because it was built with high-alumina cement, a dangerous material which often made buildings structurally unsound. The building was demolished in 1984. Eight years later, residents of Portslade (a former urban district which became part of Hove in 1974) lost their 80-year-old church when the site was redeveloped for housing.

Displaced congregations

The former parishes of several demolished Anglican churches were absorbed into those of neighbouring churches, which the displaced worshippers then joined. St Michael and All Angels Church in the Clifton Hill area took in the former parish of All Saints Church on Compton Avenue. The parish of All Souls Church, which served a densely populated part of Kemptown around Eastern Road until extensive urban renewal and road widening took place in the 1960s, became part of nearby St Mary the Virgin's parish. This had already received former members of St James's Church, which was lost in the 1950s. When the Diocese of Chichester decided that the seafront area immediately to the east (around the original Kemp Town estate which gave the wider area its name) could no longer support both St George's Church and the smaller St Anne's Church, the latter was sold for demolition and redevelopment (although some internal fittings were retrieved) and the congregation joined St George's. St Patrick's Church in Hove took in former worshippers at Christ Church, just across the boundary in the Montpelier area of Brighton, after an arson attack led to the latter's closure and demolition. The Church of the Holy Resurrection, the first Anglican church to close in Brighton, joined the parish of its near neighbour St Paul's; the building was in commercial use for many years before its demolition. The parishes of St Matthew's Church in the Queen's Park area and St Saviour's Church in Round Hill were absorbed by two churches—St Mark's and St Augustine's respectively—which have subsequently closed.

The congregations of some other former churches also officially joined other church communities.  When the Roman Catholic  of Our Lady Star of the Sea and St Denis in Portslade closed in 1992, the Diocese of Arundel and Brighton merged its parish with that of Southwick, a town in the neighbouring district of Adur. St Theresa of Lisieux's Church, built in 1955 for Southwick's Roman Catholics, served both towns thereafter.  The closure in 1943 of Preston Park Methodist Church (demolished in 1974) led to its worshippers joining the Stanford Avenue Methodist Church on the other side of the park. The merger in 1972 of the Congregational Church, the Presbyterian Church of England and several other denominations to form the United Reformed Church resulted in overcapacity in both Hove and Brighton.  At Hove, the former St Cuthbert's Congregational Church became redundant in the early 1980s when services were consolidated at the Cliftonville Congregational Church (later renamed Central United Reformed Church); and in Brighton, the Union Chapel on Air Street was sold to office developers to pay for a new multi-purpose building, the Brighthelm Church and Community Centre, in the nearby grounds of Hanover Chapel. This early 19th-century building had housed a Presbyterian community, the Queen's Road Presbyterian Church, since 1847; but it was dilapidated and, because of the Congregational–Presbyterian merger, surplus to requirements.

Demolished places of worship

Gallery

See also
List of places of worship in Brighton and Hove
List of demolished places of worship in East Sussex
List of demolished places of worship in West Sussex

References

Notes

Bibliography

 
Brighton and Hove

Demolished places of worship
Lists of buildings and structures in East Sussex